The African Fugu (Smock) also called Batakari in local Ghanaian language is a customary traditional men's garment from West Africa.  It has gained acceptance in the whole of Ghana though it originates from Northern Ghana. The name Fugu is a translation from the Moshie word for cloth. The Dagombas call the garment Bingba.

In the 19th century, batakari was worn by Ashanti military forces as a war dress. The war dress was made out of cotton and covered with leather pouches and metal cases that contained talismans as it was believed by the Ashanti forces that this variant of the batakari was bulletproof.

References 

General references
 
 

Ghanaian fashion
African fashion